The 2003 Women's Oceania Cup was the third edition of the women's field hockey tournament. It was held from 25 to 31 May in Melbourne, Wellington and Whangarei.

The tournament served as a qualifier for the 2004 Summer Olympics.

Australia won the tournament for the third time, defeating New Zealand in the three–game series, 3–0.

Squads

Head Coach: David Bell

Results

Pool

Fixtures

Statistics

Final standings

Goalscorers

References

Women's Oceania Cup
Oceania Cup
Oceania Cup
Oceania Cup
International women's field hockey competitions hosted by Australia
International women's field hockey competitions hosted by New Zealand